Puerto Rican singer, songwriter and actor Ricky Martin has released four video albums and appeared in sixty-two music videos, twelve films, thirteen television programs, and several television commercials. He ranks among the greatest music video artists of all time and is regarded as a video icon.

In 1991, Martin released his debut single "Fuego Contra Fuego", as the lead single for his first solo album, Ricky Martin alongside the accompanying music video. The music video for "Te Extraño, Te Olvido, Te Amo", the lead single from his third studio album A Medio Vivir (1995), was directed by Gustavo Garzón and won Lo Nuestro Award for Video of the Year. He filmed a remake video for the song in August 1997 in France which was directed by Christophe Gstalder. Four separate videos were released for "María", the second single from the album. The first uses the original track from the A Medio Vivir album and shows Martin performing the song on a stage at a concert, with some shots of him singing and dancing to the song in the colorful barrio of La Boca in Buenos Aires with the local people. The second version is set to the Pablo Flores Remix of the song and uses scenes and shots of the original video plus added takes of Martin performing in concert or at the barrio, close shots of locals dancing, etc. Both the original and the remix video were released in 1995. A third version, the least known, was filmed to the Pablo Flores Spanglish Remix in 1997. The last version was shot in France and directed by Memo del Bosque in 1997. Also set to the Pablo Flores Remix of the song, this version of the video is considered to be the official version, and is also the most popular.
In 1997, Ricky Martin recorded the music video for the song "No Importa La Distancia", the official Spanish version of "Go the Distance" by Michael Bolton, for the movie Hercules. It was the first time that Disney adapted one of its promotional themes for Latin America and it was a great international success.

The music video for "Vuelve", the lead single from his fourth studio album Vuelve (1998), was shot by Wayne Isham in December 1997 at the interior of the Ennis House in Los Angeles and released in January 1998. Three separate videos were released for "The Cup of Life", the second single from the album. Three more singles, accompanied with separate music videos were released from the album.

The video for "Livin' la Vida Loca", the first single from Martin's self-titled debut English-language album, directed by Wayne Isham and starring Croatian model Nina Morić, was shot in Los Angeles. It aired later the same month and received six nominations at the 1999 MTV Video Music Awards including Video of the Year, Best Male Video, Best Choreography in a Video and Viewer's Choice. It won two primary awards for Best Pop Video, and Best Dance Video, and was voted three additional awards in the international Viewers Choice categories. It also won Ritmo Latino Music Award for Music Video of the Year. The video features Ricky Martin performing in a pub with his band and hanging out with a lady (Nina Morić) at different locations, including New York City. One scene shows several dancers taking their shirts off and performing choreographed dance moves while it rains; this scene coincides with the line in the pre-chorus "She'll make you take your clothes off and go dancing in the rain". Various snippets of the video seem to merge into each other over the duration of the song. Towards the end of the video, Martin gets distracted by his lady passenger while driving, causing him to drive erratically and causing another car to veer and hit a fire hydrant, releasing a fountain of water; this was also the first scene of the video. Three more singles, accompanied with separate music videos were released from the album.

The music video for "She Bangs", the lead single from his sixth studio album Sound Loaded (2000), was directed by Wayne Isham and shot at the Atlantis Paradise Island hotel in the Bahamas. The singer described the concept of the video as being part of a trilogy with "María" and "Livin' la Vida Loca", "with this girl who drives me crazy because she's crazy, she won't talk to me or tell me her name". Martin told Univision he envisioned the visual taking place in Atlantis and felt that the Bahamas was the perfect place to film it. Jamie King helped with the creative direction of the video and over 100 people were involved in the production process. A body double for Martin was used during the scenes with sharks. The Spanish version of the music video premiered on September 26, 2000 for the Hispanophone market, while the English version debuted on MTV's Making the Video series the following day. The video begins with a group of women on a beach at night swimming to an underwater nightclub, with Martin following them. Martin explained that filming the scene was hard for him because he had to resist without taking air for a long time, as well as having to mime the lyrics without blowing bubbles out of his mouth. Upon entering the nightclub, Martin proceeds to sing "She Bangs" as he dances with the people in the club, with several scenes resembling an orgy. In one scene, Martin sees himself being seduced by mermaids and is later taken into a closet, in which he dances erotically with several women. Near the end of the visual, Martin spills a bottle of water on himself and the people nearby him. The music video concludes with him returning to the surface at daylight. At the 2nd Annual Latin Grammy Awards in 2001, Martin and Isham won the award for Best Short Form Music Video. In the same year, it was the Video of the Year at the 13th Lo Nuestro Awards. Two music videos for his next single, "Nobody Wants to Be Lonely" were directed by Wayne Isham in Coral Gables, Florida, which first aired on January 15, 2001. One music video is set to the English-language duet 'Nobody Wants to Be Lonely' with Christina Aguilera, while the other is set to the Spanish-language solo 'Sólo Quiero Amarte'.

In 2003, Martin released "Tal Vez", as the lead single for his seventh studio  album, Almas del Silencio (2003). The accompanying music video, directed by Kacho Lopez and Carlos Pérez, aired in March 2003. Four more singles, accompanied with separate music videos were released from the album.

The music videos for "I Don't Care", the lead single for his eighth studio album, Life (2005), and its Spanish version "Qué Más Da" were filmed in Brooklyn, New York City, and directed by Diane Martel. The video for the English version features Fat Joe and Amerie, and the Spanish version features Fat Joe and Debi Nova. Both videos premiered simultaneously in September 2005.

In 2006, Martin released his first live album, MTV Unplugged accompanied with a video album and won Best Long Form Music Video at the 8th Annual Latin Grammy Awards.

The music video for The Best Thing About Me Is You the lead single for his ninth studio album, Música + Alma + Sexo (2011) was filmed on December 20 and 21, 2010 in Miami, Florida and directed by Carlos Pérez. The video for the English version premiered on Martin's Vevo channel on January 11, 2011. Joss Stone does not appear in the video. The Spanish version of the video was released on Univision and also does not feature Natalia Jiménez. It was nominated as the Best Short Form Music Video at the 12th Annual Latin Grammy Awards.

In 2015, he released his tenth studio album, A Quien Quiera Escuchar. Four singles were released from the album with separate music videos. The music video for its third single, "La Mordidita" received over one billion views on YouTube. The Music video for his 2016 single "Vente Pa' Ca" featuring Colombian singer Maluma received over 1.6 billion views on YouTube and is Martin's most viewed video to date.

In 2020, he released his first extended play, Pausa. The music video for its second single, "Tiburones" was filmed in Puerto Rico and directed by Kacho Lopez. It shows Martin walking in front of an armoured vehicle while police in riot gear face off against what appears to be a citizen protest. The tension is palpable, but what unfolds is a massive street party as the protest turns into a celebration, the police dropping their helmets and weapons to join in. It was nominated as Video with a Purpose in 2020 Premios Juventud.

He also acted on stage and TV in Mexico, where he achieved modest fame in the early 1990s. In 1994, he appeared on the US TV soap opera General Hospital as a Puerto Rican singer. In 2018, he portrayed Antonio D'Amico in the miniseries The Assassination of Gianni Versace: American Crime Story, which earned him a nomination for the Primetime Emmy Award for Outstanding Supporting Actor in a Limited Series or Movie.

Music videos

As lead artist

As featured artist

Guest appearances

Video releases

Albums

Other

Filmography

Television

Film

Commercials

See also
Ricky Martin albums discography
Ricky Martin singles discography

References

Videographies of Puerto Rican artists
Ricky Martin